Roger H. McDonough (February 24, 1909 – December 2, 2001) was an American librarian and president of the American Library Association from 1968 to 1969.

He worked at the Rutgers University Libraries as an undergraduate and continued working there as a reference librarian while he attended the Columbia University School of Library Service for a degree in library science. In 1937 he became the Director of New Brunswick, New Jersey Public Library.

In 1947, he was named the first professional State Librarian for the state of New Jersey. In that role, McDonough focused on cooperation among the state's libraries and developed a law library to serve the New Jersey state legislature. McDonough also supported the creation of a graduate school of library science at Rutgers University in 1954 and  the New Jersey State Cultural Center in 1965. When he retired in 1975, he continued to work as a consultation to the New Jersey Library Association.

References

 

1909 births
2001 deaths
American librarians
Presidents of the American Library Association
Columbia University School of Library Service alumni
Rutgers University alumni